The 42nd Annual Tejano Music Awards ceremony will be held on November 26, 2022. It will recognize the best recordings, compositions, and artists of Tejano music during the eligibility year, running from January 1, 2021, to December 31, 2021. 

The 42nd Annual Tejano Music Awards will be held at the Tech Port Center + Arena in San Antonio, Texas. It will be the first ceremony to have a live show and in-person audience since the 2019 Tejano Music Awards.

Pre-show and voting 
Unlike the previous ceremonies, singles released in 2020 or a single released in 2021 on an album released in 2022, are eligible for submission for the Tejano Music Award for Song of the Year category. Nominations are currently being accepted through July 31, 2022. During preliminaries, industry voting will commence on August 21, 2022, through September 18, 2022. Industry voting submitted through mail must be postmarked on September 16, 2022, to be accepted. The top 12 nominations for each category will be announced on the Tejano Music Award website on October 3, 2022, and will be open to public voting until November 6, 2022. 

It was announced on July 6, 2022, that the 42nd annual Tejano Music Awards (TMAs) will be held at the 3,200-seat Tech Port Center + Arena in San Antonio, Texas. The venue opened in May 2022 and is the first time that the TMAs will be held there.

References

Works cited

External links 
 

Tejano Music Awards by year
Tejano Music Awards
Tejano Music Awards
Tejano Music Awards
Tejano Music Awards